Sir William was a champion racehorse.  He was the winner of the 1838 Grand Liverpool steeplechase, later to be known as the Grand National. Only three runners took part, with the previous year's winner, The Duke, sent off as 1/2 favourite. He finished last of the three in the race.  The winner was ridden by Irishman, Alan McDonogh.

References

 Sir William's pedigree
 Details of Sir Williams 1838 Grand National

National Hunt racehorses
Non-Thoroughbred racehorses
Racehorses trained in the United Kingdom
Racehorses bred in the United Kingdom
1830 racehorse births